Mount Cassidy is a mountain,  high, which forms a salient angle in the northeast part of Prentice Plateau, Olympus Range, McMurdo Dry Valleys. Rude Spur descends from the east side of the mountain. It was named by the Advisory Committee on Antarctic Names (2004) after Dennis S. Cassidy, Curator of the Antarctic Marine Geology Research Facility and Core Library, Florida State University, Tallahassee, from 1962 to 1991.

References
 

Mountains of Victoria Land
McMurdo Dry Valleys